Eugene Earl Thompson (June 7, 1917 – August 24, 2006), nicknamed "Junior", was an American right-handed pitcher in Major League Baseball who played for the Cincinnati Reds and New York Giants.

Born in Latham, Illinois, Thompson made his professional debut in the Reds' farm system in 1935. After a year off, he spent 1937 and 1938 with several minor league teams, primarily the Syracuse Chiefs. He was promoted to the Reds the following year and made his major league debut on April 26, 1939.

Thompson played for the Reds between 1939 and 1942, earning 39 wins against 27 losses. He was 13–5 as a rookie, but lost Game 3 of the World Series against the New York Yankees as the Reds were swept. Thompson was a member of the Reds team that won the 1940 World Series against the Detroit Tigers, achieving a 16–9 record in the regular season although he was ineffective in his only Series start in Game 5. He played for the Giants in 1947–48, posting an 8–8 record. He ended his career with a record of 47–35, a 3.26 earned run average and 315 strikeouts in 185 games and  innings pitched.

In between playing for the Reds and Giants, Thompson served in the United States Navy during World War II.

After his career ended, Thompson became a scout for the Giants, by then in San Francisco, serving in that capacity for 40 years. He worked briefly for the Cleveland Indians and Chicago Cubs before finishing his career with the San Diego Padres, finally retiring in 2005. He died at age 89 in Scottsdale, Arizona.

References

External links

Junior Thompson at The Deadball Era

Further reading
 

1917 births
2006 deaths
Baseball players from Illinois
Chicago Cubs scouts
Cincinnati Reds players
Cleveland Indians scouts
Columbia Reds players
Jersey City Giants players
Major League Baseball pitchers
New York Giants (NL) players
Paducah Indians players
Peoria Reds players
Sacramento Solons players
San Diego Padres (minor league) players
San Diego Padres scouts
San Francisco Giants scouts
Syracuse Chiefs players
Waterloo Reds players
United States Navy personnel of World War II